Christiane Flamand (born 8 May 1955) is a Swiss former swimmer. She competed in the women's 4 × 100 metre freestyle relay at the 1972 Summer Olympics.

References

External links
 

1955 births
Living people
Olympic swimmers of Switzerland
Swimmers at the 1972 Summer Olympics
Place of birth missing (living people)
Swiss female freestyle swimmers
20th-century Swiss women